Vittersbourg is a commune in the Moselle department in Grand Est in north-eastern France.

Etymology
The toponym Vittersbourg is of Germanic origin, deriving from anthroponym Widhari.

See also
 Communes of the Moselle department

References

External links
 

Communes of Moselle (department)